The 8th Canadian Folk Music Awards were presented in Saint John, New Brunswick on November 17, 2012, and streamed online on Roots Music Canada's website.  Winners were named in 17 categories, while recipients also were honored with special Innovator of the Year and Unsung Hero awards during a gala event at the Imperial Theatre that was hosted by Benoit Bourque of La Bottine Souriante.

Nominees and recipients
Recipients are listed first and highlighted in boldface.

Other special awards
Two other special presentations were made at the ceremony.  Harmonica genius Mike Stevens was named Innovator of the Year for 2012 for his work founding and dedication to Arts Can Circle.  This award was created and presented by Folk Music Canada.  Also, Saint John, New Brunswick's Gerry Taylor was recognized as Atlantic Canada's Unsung Hero of folk music in the region, for his contribution for over half a century as a newspaper columnist, talent scout and judge.

References

External links
Canadian Folk Music Awards

08
Culture of Saint John, New Brunswick
Canadian Folk Music Awards
Canadian Folk Music Awards
Canadian Folk Music Awards
Canadian Folk Music Awards